William James Geffrard Bluett (1834–23 November 1885) was a 19th-century Member of Parliament in the Canterbury region of New Zealand.

References

1834 births
1885 deaths
New Zealand MPs for South Island electorates
Members of the New Zealand House of Representatives
19th-century New Zealand politicians